The United States military has designated two aircraft versions as the C-20 Gulfstream:
 The Gulfstream III, designated the C-20A/B/C/D/E in military service.
 The Gulfstream IV, designated the C-20F/G/H in military service.

Gulfstream aircraft
1980s United States military transport aircraft
Set index articles on vehicles